The Old Post Office is a historic former post office building on Convention Boulevard in Hot Springs, Arkansas.  It is a steel and masonry structure, two stories in height, finished in brick and stone, with Renaissance Revival styling.  Its main facade is five bays wide, with a center entrance set in a round-arch entrance with an elaborate keystone.  The interior lobby area has its original red marble finish, with quartersawn oak trim.  The former post office was built in 1901, and is one of the city's best examples of Renaissance Revival architecture.

The building was listed on the National Register of Historic Places in 1990.

See also 

National Register of Historic Places listings in Garland County, Arkansas
List of United States post offices

References 
 

Post office buildings on the National Register of Historic Places in Arkansas
Renaissance Revival architecture in Arkansas
Government buildings completed in 1901
Buildings and structures in Hot Springs, Arkansas
National Register of Historic Places in Hot Springs, Arkansas